Otterøya or Otrøyna is an unpopulated island in Bømlo municipality in Vestland county, Norway.  The  island lies in the Bømlafjorden, southeast of the islands of Føyno, Nautøya, and Spyssøya.  The southern part of the island is a nature reserve. The Bømlafjord Tunnel runs underneath the island.

See also
List of islands of Norway

References

Islands of Vestland
Bømlo
Uninhabited islands of Norway